Softswiss (stylised as SOFTSWISS) is a software development company that provides gaming software and payment processing systems for online gambling operators. It also provides gaming operation services and licensing infrastructure. It maintains hundreds of online casinos, mostly through white label partners. 

The company was initially launched in 2008 to develop online auction software, but officially founded only in 2012.

Company operations 

The company was founded by Ivan Montik and Dmitry Yaikau in 2008, who are both from Belarus, where SOFTSWISS’ software is developed. It is a registered brand and trademark of the SOFTSWISS Group, which comprises multiple companies and brands operating in various locations. In 2013, in London, SOFTSWISS online casino platform was presented by Ivan Montik for the first time at the ICE Totally Gaming show. 

SOFTSWISS transported over 100 employees from Belarus to Ukraine in August 2020, following difficulties the company faced in light of the local political situation in Belarus.

After a brutal crackdown on protests, the company relocated most of its employees with families to Georgia and Poland.

References

Software companies of Belarus